Mr. Trucker is a board game published in 1987 by Marketing International.

Contents
Mr. Trucker is a game in which the player delivers goods to other cities to receive payment.

Reception
Alan R. Moon reviewed Mr. Trucker for Games International magazine, and gave it 1 star out of 5, and stated that "I got several promotional items with the game [...] The blind leading the blind. Take it from me, this is a turkey."

References

Board games introduced in 1987